Julia Hummer (born 24 April 1980) is a German actress and singer. She appeared in more than twenty films since 1999.

Selected filmography

References

External links
 

1980 births
Living people
People from Hagen
German film actresses
German television actresses
20th-century German actresses
21st-century German actresses